Noah Zinedine Frick (born 16 October 2001) is a Liechtensteiner footballer who plays as a forward for Swiss club Montlingen and the Liechtenstein national team.

Club career
Frick signed for FC Vaduz in 2018 and spent two years at the club under manager and father Mario Frick. In total he made 45 appearances and scored four goals in the Swiss Challenge League over that time. During the 2019–20 season, Vaduz earned promotion to the Swiss Super League just days before the player's contract expired. Although he did not receive a new contract offer from the team, teams from the German 2. Bundesliga had reportedly expressed interest.

On 24 September 2020 it was announced that Frick had signed a two-year contract with Neuchâtel Xamax of the Swiss Challenge League with a club option for an additional season. In July 2021 it was reported that he had joined Swiss Promotion League club SC Brühl during its preseason preparations. The following month it was announced that Frick had officially joined the club for the upcoming season.

In January 2022 it was announced that Frick had signed for FC Gossau of the Swiss 1. Liga.

Frick then moved to Montlingen in the summer of 2022.

International career
Frick made his international debut for Liechtenstein on 23 March 2019, coming on as a substitute for Nicolas Hasler in the 86th minute of the UEFA Euro 2020 qualifying home match against Greece, which finished as a 0–2 loss. In June 2019, Frick scored for Liechtenstein's U21s in their first-ever competitive victory as they beat Azerbaijan in 2021 UEFA Euro qualifying; ending a run of fifty-nine straight defeats.

Personal life
Frick is the son of former professional footballer Mario Frick, who is the all-time top scorer for Liechtenstein and four-time Liechtensteiner Footballer of the Year. Mario is now a manager, currently the head coach of Noah's club Vaduz. Noah's older brother, Yanik, is also a Liechtenstein international footballer.

Career statistics

International

International goals
Scores and results list Liechtenstein's goal tally first.

Honours
FC Vaduz
Liechtenstein Football Cup: 2018–19

References

External links
 
 
 

2001 births
Living people
People from Liestal
Liechtenstein footballers
Liechtenstein youth international footballers
Liechtenstein under-21 international footballers
Liechtenstein international footballers
Swiss people of Liechtenstein descent
People with acquired Liechtenstein citizenship
Association football forwards
FC Vaduz players
Swiss Challenge League players
Sportspeople from Basel-Landschaft